Obinna Emmanuel Onwujekwe is a Nigerian medical doctor who serves as Professor of Health Economics and Policy and Pharmacoeconomics in the Departments of Health Administration & Management and Pharmacology and Therapeutics, College of Medicine, based in University of Nigeria.

Early life and education
Onwujekwe qualified as a medical doctor from University of Nigeria and later obtained a MSc in Health Economics. He obtained a Certificate in District Health Management from the Swiss Tropical Institute Basel. He then proceeded to the United Kingdom where he bagged a PhD in Health Economics and Policy from the London School of Hygiene and Tropical Medicine.

Career
Onwujekwe was a member of a DFID-funded Consortium for Research on Equitable Health Systems (CREHS) from 2006 to 2010. He was also a member of the European Commission-funded Eval-Health project from 2011 to 2014. He was also the Dean in the Faculty of Health Sciences and Technology at UNN between August 2012 to July 2014; and the Head of Department of Health Administration and Management between 2005 and 2012.

Since 2007, Onwujekwe has served as a Director at the West African Health Economics Network (WAHEN). He has also been the National Coordinator of the Nigerian Malaria Control Association (NaMCA) from 2009; the President of the Nigerian Health Economics Association (NiHEA) since 2010; and the Chairman of the University of Nigeria Senate Research Grants Committee since 2014.

Academic contributions
Onwujekwe conducts research on health economics - especially looking at the impact of the stigma of HIV/AIDS in Nigeria on the willingness to access anti-retroviral drugs, and malaria prevention strategies. His work has been important in informing international aid agencies such as DFID's aid agencies.

Other activities
 World Health Organization (WHO), Member of the African Advisory Committee for Research and Development
 Network for Health Equity and Development (NHED), Member of the Board of Directors

Publications

Journal articles
Onwujekwe has authored and co-authored dozens of peer-reviewed articles including:

References

External links
Faculty page
Obinna Onwujekwe on Google Scholar
Obinna Onwujekwe on The Conversation

Living people
Nigerian economists
Health economists
Academic staff of the University of Nigeria
Year of birth missing (living people)